Dutch Design Awards (DDA) honours the best Dutch designs across eight categories. It awards design initiatives and designers in the Netherlands each year, in first place by relevance and impact, but also to the extent to which they relate to their own field.  

The awards are handed out during the annual Dutch Design Week in the Dutch city of Eindhoven. A year book and exhibition of the nominated designs are also presented as part of the event. Dutch Design Awards are organised by the Dutch Design Foundation and the city of Eindhoven.

Overview 
Dutch Design Awards have been handed out since 2003. In 2008, the name was changed from the Dutch-language Nederlandse Design Prijzen to the current name.

Twenty prizes are handed out during an annual awards show. In addition to the main prize, the Golden Eye, which honours the most successful Dutch designer or design studio, awards are handed out in a number of categories. Each category has its own selection committee, and the winners are selected by an international jury. One exception is the public award, the Audi Design Award; the winner of this prize is chosen from a shortlist by means of a public election held on the Web site of the Dutch Design Awards and in the Bijenkorf department store in Eindhoven.

In 2009, the awards were presented on October 17 at Muziekcentrum Frits Philips in Eindhoven. The main prize, the Golden Eye, went to Studio Wieki Somers (Wieki Somers and Dylan van den Berg) for their Merry-go-round Coat Rack, a carousel-like construction to hang coats, designed for the cloakroom of  Museum Boijmans Van Beuningen. During the awards ceremony, the first edition of the Dutch Design Jaarboek was presented to Eindhoven mayor Rob van Gijzel. The nominated designs were exhibited from October 17 to 25 at the Brainport Greenhouse, a large glass greenhouse on Stadhuisplein square in Eindhoven.

Categories
 Data & Interaction
Communication
 Design Research
Fashion
Habitat
Product
Best Commissioning
Young Designer
Other awards:
 Public Award
 BNO Piet Zwart Prijs

See also
 Dutch Design Week
 Dutch Design
 Dutch Furniture Awards
 Rotterdam Design Award

References

External links
 Website of the Dutch Design Awards

Dutch design
Design awards
2003 establishments in the Netherlands
 Awards established in 2003
Dutch awards
Culture in Eindhoven